Sugar Creek is a 2007 American Western supernatural film directed by James Cotten and starring Dustin Alford, Kevin Gage, Robert Miano, and Daniel Kruse. It is set in 1889 and was filmed in Arkansas.

Premise
Sugar Creek follows Adam Stanton as he awakes, alone in a field and without his shoes. Setting out in search of help he finds the local townspeople to be afraid of him.

Cast 
 Dustin Alford as Young Adam
 Jeff Bailey as Abe McGovern
 Kevin Gage as Sheriff Worton
 Jake Glascock as Kevin
 Dayton Knoll as Kane St. Clair
 Daniel Kruse as Adam Stanton
 Robert Miano as Pete St. Clair
 Joshua Payne as Jacob
 David Pickens as The Pastor
 Gary Ragland as John Malory
 Sarah Swofford as Evelyn

External links
 

2007 films
2007 thriller films
2007 Western (genre) films
2000s English-language films
American Western (genre) films
2000s American films